Hédi Saïdi, born in 1897 in Tunis, Tunisia and died in 1948 in Cairo, Egypt, was a Tunisian politician.

Early life
He was born into an old family of artisans in Tunis.
He studied in France, became interested in politics, and started his  professional career at the end of the 1920s by combining with his brother Hamida to create the printing company The Union  which, besides classical services, prints political magazines, inventories and booklets.

Politics
From 1934, Saïdi was the leader of the propaganda of Neo Destour and one of the pillars of the underground action of the party: it formed the "group of conflict", aimed by him and Béchir Zarg Layoun, within whom activists broke telephone and telegraph lines and distributed pamphlets calling to conflict. He spent three years in prison before being liberated by the Germans who occupied Tunisia from the end of 1942. He then left Tunisia then and joined Habib Bourguiba in Cairo, on June 9, 1946, and died in 1948. Some streets in Tunisia still carry Saïdi's name.

1897 births
1948 deaths
Neo Destour politicians
Tunisian expatriates in France
Tunisian emigrants to Egypt